Gulzarbagh railway station, station code GZH, is a railway station in the Danapur division of East Central Railway. It is a part of the Patna railway hub which has five major stations: Patna Junction railway station, Patliputra station, Rajendra Nagar Terminal railway station, Gulzarbagh station, Danapur station and Patna Sahib railway station. Gulzarbagh is connected to metropolitan areas of India, by the Delhi–Kolkata main line via Mugalsarai–Patna route. Gulzarbagh station is located in Gulzarbagh city in Patna district in the Indian state of Bihar. Due to its location on the Howrah–Patna–Mughalsarai main line many Patna, Barauni-bound express trains coming from Howrah, Sealdah stop here.

Facilities 
The major facilities available are waiting rooms, computerized reservation facility, vehicle parking. The vehicles are allowed to enter the station premises. The station also has STD/ISD/PCO Telephone booth, toilets, tea stall and book stall.

Platforms 
There platforms 3 platforms at Gulzarbagh railway station. The platforms  are interconnected with foot overbridges (FOB).

Trains 
Many passenger and express trains serve Gulzarbagh station.

Nearest airports 
The nearest airports to Gulzarbagh station are:
Lok Nayak Jayaprakash Airport, Patna 
Gaya Airport 
Netaji Subhas Chandra Bose International Airport, Kolkata

See also 

 Agam Kuan

References

External links 
 Gulzarbagh Station Map
 Official website of the Patna district

Danapur railway division
Railway stations in Patna